The 1986–87 Divizia A was the sixty-ninth season of Divizia A, the top-level football league of Romania.

Teams

League table

Positions by round

Results

Top goalscorers

Champion squad

See also 

 1986–87 Divizia B

References

Liga I seasons
Romania
1986–87 in Romanian football